Daniel Timothy Bohn (born June 29, 1988) is an American professional stock car racing driver. He last competed part-time in the NASCAR Camping World Truck Series, driving the No. 20 Chevrolet Silverado for Young's Motorsports.

Racing career

NASCAR Modified Tours

Truck Series
Bohn attempted the 2019 NASCAR Hall of Fame 200 at Martinsville Speedway. He started the race 19th, making his debut the next day, finishing 8th. His team, On Point Motorsports, later announced a two-race extension to close out the season. Bohn would have a disappointing run at ISM and Homestead finishing 27th at ISM after blowing a right-front tire early and finishing 25th at Homestead-Miami.

He returned to On Point in 2020, initially on a five-race schedule for the team starting at Atlanta Motor Speedway. NASCAR Cup Series driver Brennan Poole ran much of the season before exhausting his remaining starts in August, with Bohn taking over the No. 30 for the rest of the year starting at World Wide Technology Raceway.

On January 28, 2021, OPM announced that Bohn would be back with them in 2021 in the No. 30. The team retained his 2020 sponsor, North American Motor Car, for at least the season-opener at Daytona. The team stated that a full season was possible if additional sponsorship could be found.

Xfinity Series
On February 1, 2021, Big Machine Racing announced Bohn would make his NASCAR Xfinity Series debut in the season opener at Daytona International Speedway as the team's regular driver Jade Buford was not approved for the event.

Motorsports career results

NASCAR
(key) (Bold – Pole position awarded by qualifying time. Italics – Pole position earned by points standings or practice time. * – Most laps led.)

Xfinity Series

Camping World Truck Series

Whelen Modified Tour

Whelen Southern Modified Tour

 Season still in progress
 Ineligible for series points

References

External links

 

1988 births
Living people
NASCAR drivers
People from Freehold Township, New Jersey
Racing drivers from New Jersey